Chandarkey Rajputan is a village in the Narowal Tehsil of Narowal District in the Punjab province of Pakistan. As its name suggests, its population consists of many Muslim Rajputs of Bhatti tribe.

History
The written history of the village describes the origin of its inhabitants to a village named "Chitala" in the Sirsa district of Indian Punjab. According to this history, three men from that village approached Rai Sandal Khan Bhatti who was their tribal chief and Raja, and also the grandfather of famous Rai Abdullah Khan Bhatti a.k.a. Dulla Bhatti for job. Upon his recommendation, the three men were hired by a Mughal. Upon their master's death, the three divided the land among themselves since their master did not leave any survivors. Chand being the literate one of the three was the one dealing with the official matters and hence the name of the village came to be "Chandarkey Rajputan" after Chand.

Villages in Narowal District